The Downs are an area of public open limestone downland in Bristol, England. They consist of Durdham Down to the north and east and Clifton Down to the south, separated by Stoke Road.

Durdham Down

It is owned by Bristol City Council for the benefit of the people of Bristol.

Clifton Down

It is owned by the Society of Merchant Venturers.

Management
Since an Act of Parliament in 1861, when Bristol Corporation acquired Durdham Down, the Downs have been managed as a single unit by the Downs Committee, a joint committee of the corporation and the Merchant Venturers. They have been designated common land since the early 1970s by Bristol City Council.

Background 
They are used for leisure, walking, team sports and sightseeing (especially at the Avon Gorge cliff edge).  There are permanent football pitches, used by the Bristol Downs Football League. There are also temporary attractions on the Downs, such as circuses and the annual Bristol Flower Show.

A grey concrete water tower of 1954 stands on the Downs near the top of Blackboy Hill, with a long, low, covered reservoir alongside it.

In 1982 6,000 people assembled on the Downs in response to a local newspaper advertisement placed by the makers of the new breakfast television show TV-am. The 6,000 people were used to make the words 'Good', 'Morning' and 'Britain', used for the opening titles of the show. It took 2 hours to get them into place and another 2 hours to shoot.

Since 2016 it has been the site of The Downs Festival, an annual music festival with both local and nationally known bands attending.

In popular culture
The Downs played a significant role in Jack Thorne's 2018 Channel 4 mini-series Kiri.

Gallery

References

External links
Bristol City Council page on the Downs
Photographs of the Downs air vents

Avon Gorge and Downs Wildlife Project
Map of The Downs circa 1900
Minutes of the Downs Committee

 
Areas of Bristol
Parks and open spaces in Bristol
Sports venues in Bristol
Severn Beach Line